The Hemphillia dromedarius, common name the dromedary jumping-slug, is a species of air-breathing land slugs, terrestrial pulmonate gastropod mollusks in the family Arionidae, the roundback slugs.

Description
The Hemphillia dromedarius is a large slug about 60 mm long.

Distribution and conservation status
It lives in British Columbia in Canada, where the Committee on the Status of Endangered Wildlife in Canada (COSEWIC) has assessed it as a threatened species. The Canadian Species at Risk Act listed it in the List of Wildlife Species at Risk as being threatened in Canada. It is also found in Washington State.

References

External links
Jumping Slugs of the Pacific NW

Arionidae
Gastropods described in 1972